Urocystis brassicae is a gall smut and a plant pathogen that stunts the infected plants. It is known to create root galls on Indian Mustard (Brassica campestris) and other Brassica species.

Physical Characteristics

Gall Characteristics 
The wart-like galls of U. brassicae grow on the roots of plants. When young, the galls are white in color. As they age, they become a grayish-black colored gall with a 2–5 cm diameter.

Spore Characteristics 
U. brassicae has two types of spores. One is fertile and the other is sterile. Fertile spores are a deep brown color with dimensions of approximately 20 by 16µ. These fertile spores are surrounded by sterile spores that are elongated and a brighter brown than the fertile spores. These sterile spores are approximately 9.9 by 6.1µ.

Distribution of U. brassicae 
U. brassicae is commonly found in India (Bihar)  and China.

References

External links 
 Index Fungorum 
 USDA ARS Fungal Database

Fungal plant pathogens and diseases
Ustilaginomycotina
Fungi described in 1938